L'Hermitage is a Greek Revival plantation home. Marius Pons Bringier commissioned the home to be built in Burnside, Ascension Parish, Louisiana, as a wedding gift for his son, Michel Douradou Bringier (1789–1847), in 1812.

Michel Bringier served at the Battle of New Orleans (1814–15) during the War of 1812. L'Hermitage was named after General Andrew Jackson's home in Nashville, Tennessee. General and Mrs. Jackson visited here in the 1820s.

The building was listed on the National Register of Historic Places in 1973.

See also
National Register of Historic Places listings in Ascension Parish, Louisiana

References

External links
"Hermitage Plantation" Official web page
Michel Douradou Bringier on Find a Grave

Houses completed in 1812
Houses on the National Register of Historic Places in Louisiana
Houses in Ascension Parish, Louisiana
National Register of Historic Places in Ascension Parish, Louisiana